Glen Wilkie (born 22 January 1977) is an English former footballer. He played for Football League 1 club Leyton Orient in the 1995-1996 season.

Career
Born in Bethnal Green, London, Wilkie progressed through Leyton Orient academy and made his debut for the club in 1995 at the age of 17 against Crewe away marking a young Danny Murphy. In total he appeared in nineteen matches for the Os, including four as substitute.
He later went on to play in Finland for IFK Mariehamn & Hammarland IF over 4 seasons, scoring 18 goals.

Personal life
In 2012, he appeared on the 25th series of Come Dine with Me, winning the Reading leg of the series.

References

External links

1977 births
Living people
Footballers from Bethnal Green
English footballers
Association football defenders
Leyton Orient F.C. players